Ehsan Riaz Fatyana is a Pakistani politician who was a Member of the Provincial Assembly of the Punjab, from May 2013 to May 2018.

Early life and education
He was born on 15 December 1987 in Lahore to Riaz Fatyana and Ashifa Riaz Fatyana.

He received his early education from Aitchison College and obtained a degree of Bachelor of Business Administration (Hons) in 2011 from Lahore School of Economics.

Political career

He was elected to the Provincial Assembly of the Punjab as an independent candidate from Constituency PP-58 (Faisalabad-VIII) in 2013 Pakistani general election. He became the youngest member of the Provincial Assembly of the Punjab.

In April 2018, he joined Pakistan Tehreek-e-Insaf.

References

Living people
Punjab MPAs 2013–2018
1987 births
Politicians from Lahore
Aitchison College alumni
Lahore School of Economics alumni